Mareşal may refer to:

 Mareșal (Romania)
 Mareşal (Turkey)
 Mareșal (tank destroyer), designed in Romania during World War II